Graham Hurd Chapin (February 10, 1799 – September 8, 1843) was an American lawyer and politician who served one term as a U.S. Representative from New York from 1835 to 1837.

Biography 
Born in Salisbury, Connecticut, Chapin moved to Lyons, New York in 1817. He graduated from Yale College in 1819.
He studied law.  He was admitted to the bar in 1823 and practiced in Lyons.
Surrogate of Wayne County 1826–1833.

Political career 
He served as district attorney of Wayne County in 1829 and 1830.  He moved to Rochester, New York, in 1833 and continued the practice of law.

Congress 
Chapin was elected as a Jacksonian to the Twenty-fourth Congress (March 4, 1835 – March 3, 1837).

Death 
He died in Mount Morris, New York, September 8, 1843.

References

1799 births
1843 deaths
Yale College alumni
Jacksonian members of the United States House of Representatives from New York (state)
19th-century American politicians
People from Salisbury, Connecticut
People from Lyons, New York
Politicians from Rochester, New York
People from Mount Morris, New York
Wayne County District Attorneys
Members of the United States House of Representatives from New York (state)